Richard Bird may refer to:

 Richard Bird (actor) (1895–1979), British actor
 Richard Ely Bird (1878–1955), American politician
 Richard Bird (computer scientist) (1943–2022), professor at Oxford
 Richard Real Bird, American politician and former chairman of the Crow Nation of Montana
 Richard A. Bird (born 1940), American politician
 Dickie Bird (born 1933), English cricket umpire

See also
 Richard Birde (disambiguation)
 Richard Byrd (disambiguation)